Brazil competed at the 1948 Summer Olympics in London, United Kingdom. 70 competitors, 59 men and 11 women, took part in 41 events in 11 sports. A Brazilian medal was won for the first time since the country's debut at the 1920 Summer Olympics, with a bronze by the basketball team. This medal was the first medal ever won by Brazilians not only in Basketball as also in a team sport.

Medalists

Athletics

Men
Track & road events

Field events

Women
Track & road events

Field events

Basketball

Preliminary round

Group A

|}

Quarterfinals

Semifinals

Bronze medal match

Boxing

Men

Diving

Men

Equestrian

Eventing

Show jumping

Fencing

Seven fencers, all men, represented Brazil in 1948.
 Men
Ranks given are within the pool.

Modern pentathlon

Three male pentathletes represented Brazil in 1948.
Men

Rowing

Brazil had two male rowers participate in one out of seven rowing events in 1948.

Men

Sailing

Open

Shooting

Seven shooters represented Brazil in 1948.
Men

Swimming

Men

Women

References

External links
Official Olympic Reports
International Olympic Committee results database

Nations at the 1948 Summer Olympics
1948
1948 in Brazilian sport